Crocinis is a genus of moths from Madagascar belonging to the subfamily Drepaninae. The genus was erected by Arthur Gardiner Butler in 1879.

Species
Crocinis boboa Watson, 1965
Crocinis canescens Watson, 1965
Crocinis felina Watson, 1965
Crocinis fenestrata Butler, 1879
Crocinis imaitsoana Watson, 1965
Crocinis licina Watson, 1965
Crocinis prolixa Watson, 1965
Crocinis spicata Watson, 1965
Crocinis tetrathyra (Mabille, 1900)
Crocinis viettei Watson, 1965

References 

Butler (1879). "Descriptions of new species of Lepidoptera from Madagascar, with notes on some of the forms already described". Annals and Magazine of Natural History. (5)4:227–246.
Watson (1965). "A revision of the Ethiopian Drepanidae (Lepidoptera)". Bulletin of the British Museum (Natural History) Entomology Supplement 3:1–178, pls. 1–18.

Drepaninae
Drepanidae genera